Armășești is a commune located in Ialomița County, Muntenia, Romania. It is composed of three villages: Armășești, Malu Roșu and Nenișori. Bărbulești was also one of its component villages until 2006, when it was split off to form a separate commune.

References

Communes in Ialomița County
Localities in Muntenia